Neita is a genus of butterflies from the subfamily Satyrinae in the family Nymphalidae.

Species
Neita durbani (Trimen, 1887)
Neita extensa (Butler, 1898)
Neita lotenia (van Son, 1949)
Neita neita (Wallengren, 1875)
Neita orbipalus Kielland, 1990
Neita victoriae (Aurivillius, 1899)

References

Satyrini
Butterfly genera